"Broken Heart (Thirteen Valleys)" is a song by Scottish rock band Big Country, which was released in 1988 as the second single from their fourth studio album Peace in Our Time. It was written by Stuart Adamson and produced by Peter Wolf. "Broken Heart (Thirteen Valleys)" reached No. 47 in the UK and remained in the charts for four weeks. A music video was filmed to promote the single. It was directed by Richard Lowenstein and shot near Wittenoom, Western Australia.

Background
"Broken Heart" originated as a track called "The Longest Day" which Big Country recorded around 1985. The song's chorus and melody was later incorporated into "Broken Heart". "The Longest Day" was included on the 1989 single release of "Peace in Our Time". In a 1988 radio interview, Adamson picked "Broken Heart" as one of his favourites from Peace in Our Time. He recalled of the song to Sounds in 1990: "I think it's the best song I've ever written. It works great on acoustic or electric. "Thirteen Valleys" is the one that got away. I'll play that song, always. I'd put it up against any song."

Reception
Upon release, Alex Kadis of Smash Hits commented: "Though at first this sounds shockingly like "She'll Be Coming 'Round the Mountain", it soon takes a turn for the better and becomes one of those superbly atmospheric songs that Big Country have become so famous for." In a review of Peace in Our Time, Steve Metsch of the Herald & Review described the song as "thoughtful" and one that is "deserving of more air play". Alice Rudolph of the Altoona Mirror noted the album's "unique rhythms", including "what could be described as high-tech cowboy" in "Broken Heart".

Jim Bohen of the Daily Record commented: "They've found new delicacy in instrumental touches like the interplay of mandolin and synthesizer that closes "Broken Heart"." Peter Tesch of The Signpost described the song as "beautiful semi-ballad", as well as being "strong and passionate". William Ruhlmann of AllMusic recommended the song by labelling it an AMG Pick Track. James Masterton, in his book Chart Watch UK - Hits of 1989, considered the song "capable of standing shoulder to shoulder with past classics such as "One Great Thing" and "Fields of Fire"."

Track listing
7" single
"Broken Heart (Thirteen Valleys)" - 5:14
"Soapy Soutar Strikes Back" - 4:15

12" single
"Broken Heart (Thirteen Valleys)" - 5:14
"Soapy Soutar Strikes Back" - 4:15
"When a Drum Beats" - 6:20
"On the Shore" - 3:39

CD single
"Broken Heart (Thirteen Valleys)" - 5:14
"Soapy Soutar Strikes Back" - 4:15
"Wonderland" (12" Version) - 7:10

CD single (UK limited edition)
"Broken Heart (Thirteen Valleys)" - 5:14
"Soapy Soutar Strikes Back" - 4:15
"Made in Heaven" - 5:10
"When a Drum Beats" - 5:04

Cassette and CD single (Canadian release)
"Broken Heart (Thirteen Valleys)" - 5:10
"Soapy Soutar Strikes Back" - 4:06
"When a Drum Beats" - 4:06
"Starred and Crossed" - 4:06

Charts

Personnel
Big Country
 Stuart Adamson - vocals, guitar
 Bruce Watson - guitar
 Tony Butler - bass
 Mark Brzezicki - drums

Additional musicians
 Peter Wolf - keyboards

Production
 Peter Wolf - producer of "Broken Heart"
 Big Country - producers of all tracks except "Broken Heart" and "Wonderland"
 Steve Lillywhite - producer of "Wonderland"
 Brian Malouf - engineer and mixing on "Broken Heart"
 Jeremy Smith - engineer on "Broken Heart"
 Gonzalo Espinoza, Jeff Poe, Kristen Connolly - assistant engineers on "Broken Heart"
 Geoff Pesche - mastering

References

1988 songs
1988 singles
Big Country songs
Songs written by Stuart Adamson
Mercury Records singles
Vertigo Records singles